Lego City Adventures is a computer-animated television series that premiered on Nickelodeon in the United States on June 22, 2019, loosely based on the long-running Lego City toyline theme. The third season of the series was released on Netflix on April 15, 2022, and the fourth season was released on The Lego Group's YouTube channel on October 25, 2022. It is the second Lego series on Nickelodeon, following 2010's Lego Hero Factory.

Overview 
Lego City Adventures is an animated series set in a busy metropolis. The series follows the adventures of the city's community workers, such as the police, firefighters and sanitation workers. Among the characters thrust into extraordinary adventures are cop Sgt. Duke DeTain, crisis-ready fire Chief Freya McCloud, grumpy street sweeper Shirley Keeper, eager handyman Harl Hubbs, dedicated city Mayor Solomon Fleck, Vice Mayor Carol Yea, rivalry business people R.E. Fendrich and Mary Sinclair, Freya's troublesome nephew Billy McCloud, and skateboarding police Chief Percival "Wheelie" Wheeler.

Characters 
 Sergeant Duke DeTain (voiced by Joe Zieja)
 Freya McCloud (voiced by Misty Lee)
 Shirley Keeper (voiced by Alex Cazares)
 Harl Hubbs (voiced by Daniel MK Cohen)
 Tippy Dorman (voiced by James Arnold Taylor)
 Solomon Fleck (voiced by Roger Craig Smith)
 Percival "Wheelie" Wheeler (voiced by Mick Lauer)

Production 
On February 14, 2019, it was announced that Lego City Adventures would be a part of Nickelodeon's 2019 slate. On May 14, 2019, it was announced that the program would premiere on June 22, 2019. The series is a co-production between Axis Studios and French companies Passion Paris and Circus for The Lego Group.

Episodes

Series overview

Season 1 (2019)

Season 2 (2020)

Season 3 (2022)

Season 4 (2022)

Critical reception 
Lego City Adventures has received favourable comments from critics about its positive messages but has also been criticised for its consumerism. Reviewer Emily Ashby for Common Sense Media gave the show a three-star rating, commenting that, "despite the fact that this series doubles as a pretty effective advertising campaign for the Lego brand/merchandise, it's a genuinely funny show with fast-paced, unpredictable humor". TV Guide UK gave the show a rating of 6/10.

Merchandise 
Lego City Adventures was produced to accompany the Lego City theme, a core product of The Lego Group. According to a Lego announcement, the series was designed as, "an important evolution of Lego City" that aimed to, "bring the unique characters, style and humor of Lego City Adventures to life".

References

External links 
 
 

Lego television series
2019 American television series debuts
2010s American animated television series
2010s Danish television series
2010s Nickelodeon original programming
2020s American animated television series
2020s Danish television series
2020s Nickelodeon original programming
American children's animated comedy television series
American computer-animated television series
Danish children's animated comedy television series
English-language television shows
Nickelodeon original programming
Adventure